Attorney General Archer may refer to:

James T. Archer (1819–1859), Attorney General of Florida
Peter Archer, Baron Archer of Sandwell (1926–2012), Shadow Attorney General for England and Wales

See also
General Archer (disambiguation)